The Haikou Power Station, also spelled Haikou Power Plant, is a coal-fired power plant in Hainan Province, located in Macunwan (马村湾), Laocheng Development Zone (老城开发区), Chengmai County. The plant has a total installed capacity of 1.21 million kilowatts, which is the first power plant in Hainan Province with an installed capacity of over one million kilowatts.

History
The construction of Haikou Power Station started in 1986, with a total dynamic investment of 2.641 billion yuan.

References 

2009 establishments in China
Energy infrastructure completed in 2009
Coal-fired power stations in China